Hepatella is a genus of crabs in the family Aethridae, containing these species:
† Hepatella amazonica Beurlen, 1958 (Lower Miocene)
Hepatella amica Smith, 1869
Hepatella peruviana Rathbun, 1933

References

Crabs
Extant Miocene first appearances
Crustacean genera
Taxa named by Sidney Irving Smith